Government Property Agency or GPA is an agency under the Financial Services and the Treasury Bureau of Hong Kong Special Administrative Region. Established on 1st April 1990, the Agency manages the government properties which were distributed among Government Secretariat, Lands Department, and Rating and Valuation Department.

Introduction

The Government Property Agency was established on 1st April 1990. Its main functions are provide suitable government accommodation to enable efficient delivery of public services, to meet the Government's needs for accommodation through optimal use of and necessary adjustments to the current stock, to provide management services for government properties through the most cost-effective means available. To modernise government properties to meet changing operational and statutory requirements, to optimise the utilisation of government sites in conjunction with other concerned departments.

Present Head of Department is Mr Eugene FUNG, J.P. ; Deputy Head is Mr Ronald CHAN

Previous Departmental Head

麥景禮, Philip Mackely (April 1990 – November 1991);

胡德品, Ian Wotherspoon (November 1991 – April 1997);

賴國鍈, Albert LAI (April 1997 – July 2001);

莫錦鈞, MOK Kam-kwan (Acting, July – August 2001);

關錫寧, Marina KWAN (August 2001 – June 2006);

郭家強, Keith KWOK (June 2006 – October 2011);

蕭如彬, Alan SIU (October 2011 – November 2015 );

詹婉珊, Sandy JIM (Acting, November – December 2015 );

袁民忠, Tommy YUEN (December 2015 – January 2019);

劉明光, Vincent LIU (January 2019 – October 2019);

蔡民偉, Leo CHOY (Acting, October 2019 – November 2019);

戴淑嬈, Leonia TAI (November 2019)

馮建業, Mr Eugene Fung (13 September 2019);

References

External links

 Annual Report 2020

Hong Kong Government
1990 establishments in Hong Kong